Eldar Allahyar oghlu Guliyev (born July 26, 1951) is an Azerbaijan politician. He became a Member of Parliament of the Azerbaijan in 2000.

Early life and career 
He was born in Baku. In 1968, he finished school at No. 187 in Baku, and in 1969, entered the Azerbaijan Institute of the National Economy (now the Azerbaijan State University of Economics). He became an economist after graduation in 1973. He served in the Soviet Army from 1974-1975. From 1975-1987, he worked in the Trade Ministry. After 1987, he worked as the chairman or the Union of Azerbaijan Central Corporations. He is married with two children.

See also
Cabinet of Azerbaijan
Government of Azerbaijan

References

External links 

 aku.edu.az sites 

1951 births
Members of the National Assembly (Azerbaijan)
Living people